Justin Dowell (born January 5, 2000) is an American freestyle BMX cyclist who has represented his nation at numerous global events including the Olympic Games, and won medals at multiple World Championships.

From Virginia Beach, Dowell is known for a trick move called The Twix which is a mix of a tail whip and a bar at the same time. He won the freestyle park event at the 2018 UCI Urban Cycling World Championships. In 2019, he obtained a bronze medal at the Pan American Games.

Dowell qualified to represent United States at the 2020 Summer Olympics, one of the 9 competitors, representing 8 nations, to qualify; Dowell finished in 8th in the Olympic final. He won silver in Abu Dhabi at the 2022 UCI Urban Cycling World Championships.

References

External links
 
 
 

2000 births
Living people
American male cyclists
BMX riders
Pan American Games bronze medalists for the United States
Pan American Games medalists in cycling
Medalists at the 2019 Pan American Games
Sportspeople from Virginia Beach, Virginia
Cyclists at the 2020 Summer Olympics
Olympic cyclists of the United States
UCI BMX World Champions (elite men)
21st-century American people